Haiti competed at the 2012 Summer Olympics in London, from 27 July to 12 August 2012. This was the nation's fifteenth appearance at the Olympics, since its national debut at the 1900 Summer Olympics in Paris. Comité Olympique Haïtien selected a team of five athletes, 3 men and 2 women, to compete only in athletics and judo.

Four Haitian athletes, however, were born in the United States. With hundreds of thousands of people rendered homeless by a devastating earthquake in 2010, Haiti struggled to produce world-class athletes, but those with the nation's links were still eager to represent their ancestors' homeland in numerous sporting events, including the Olympic games. 21-year-old judoka Linouse Desravine, however, was Haiti's lone homegrown athlete, who later became the nation's flag bearer at the opening ceremony.

Before London, Haitian athletes had won one silver medal by Silvio Cator in 1928, and one bronze medal by five rifle shooters in 1924. Haiti, however, did not win its first Olympic medal for more than 80 years. Triple jumper Samyr Laine advanced successfully into the final rounds of his event, but missed out of the nation's first medal in London after finishing farther from the standings.

Athletics

The following athletes qualified to compete in the athletics.

Men
Track & road events

Field events

Women
Track & road events

Judo

See also
Haiti at the 2011 Pan American Games

References

External links

Nations at the 2012 Summer Olympics
2012
2012 in Haitian sport